The phrase mind's eye refers to the human ability for visualization.

Mind's eye may also refer to:

Film, television and radio 
 Mind's Eye (film series), a series of computer-animated films
 Mind's Eye (radio series), a set of five dramas about the paranormal
 The Mind's Eye (film), a 2015 action-horror film about telekinetics
 The Mind's Eye (radio company), an American radio theater company
 The Mind's Eye & Mission of the Viyrans, a pair of Doctor Who audio stories
 Mind's Eye (aka The Black Hole), a 2016 film with Dean Cain

Television episodes
 "Mind's Eye" (Men of a Certain Age)
 "Mind's Eye" (The X-Files)
 "The Mind's Eye" (Star Trek: The Next Generation)
 "Mind's Eye", an episode of Women: Stories of Passion

Literature 
 Mind's Eye (novel), a 1999 novel by Paul Fleischman
 The Mind's Eye (book), a 2010 book by Oliver Sacks
 The Mind's Eye (novel), a 1993 novel by Håkan Nesser
 Engineering and the Mind's Eye, a 1992 book by Eugene S. Ferguson

Music 
 Mind's Eye (album), a 1986 album by Vinnie Moore, or the title song
 Mind's Eye (band), a Swedish progressive metal band with Johan Niemann
 "Mind's Eye" (song), a song by Wolfmother
 "Mind's Eye", a song by Goldfinger from Goldfinger
 "Mind's Eye", a song by Josh Ritter from The Historical Conquests of Josh Ritter
 The Mind's Eye (album), a 1994 album by Stiltskin
 "The Mind's Eye", a song by Dark Tranquillity from The Mind's I
 "The Mind's Eye", a song by Haken from  Visions
 "Mind's Eye", a song by DC Talk from Jesus Freak

Other uses 
 Mind's Eye (US military), a video-analysis research project
 Mind's Eye Theatre, a live action role-playing game
 Mind's Eye, a site in the Cayman Islands on the 2012 World Monuments Watch list

See also 
 The Mind's I, a 1981 book by Douglas R. Hofstadter and Daniel C. Dennett
 The Mind's I (album), a 1996 album by Dark Tranquillity
 
 My Mind's Eye (disambiguation)
 Third eye or inner eye, a mystical and esoteric concept